The women's 800 metres at the 2014 European Athletics Championships took place at the Letzigrund on 13, 14, and 16 August.

Medalists

Records

Schedule

Results

Round 1

First 3 in each heat (Q) and 4 best performers (q) advance to the Semifinals.

Semifinal

First 3 in each heat (Q) and 2 best performers (q) advance to the Final.

Final

References

Round 1 Results
Semifinal Results
Final Results

800 W
800 metres at the European Athletics Championships
2014 in women's athletics